Like Hearts Swelling is a 2003 album by Polmo Polpo. This album is the first release by Polmo Polpo after switching to Constellation Records.

The third track, "Farewell", was played by John Peel on BBC Radio 1. Tracks 1, 2 and 4 were remixed mainly acoustically for the album Plays Polmo Polpo, Sandro Perri's first album under his own name.

Track listing
 "Romeo Heart" – 7:55
 "Requiem for a Fox" – 11:04
 "Farewell" – 5:04
 "Sky Histoire" – 13:10
 "Like Hearts Swelling" – 9:40

Polmo Polpo albums
2002 albums
Constellation Records (Canada) albums